Jalšovec is a village in northern Croatia, part of the Štrigova municipality within Međimurje County. Part of the village is on Croatia's border with Slovenia.

History

Jalšovec was mentioned in the Urbarium from the second half of the 17th century as Villa Jalsowecz. In the urbarium Jalšovec is recorded as possession of Count Petar Zrinski.

The Roman Catholic Chapel in the village was built at the turn of the 19th century.

Geography

Jalšovec is located in valley between hills of Gornje Međimurje. River Mura enters Croatia from Slovenia, in the northernmost part of settlement.
There is a border crossing  with Slovenia in Jalšovec called Bukovje. Although, is located in Jalšovec, border crossing is named after the hamlet of Bukovje, which belongs to the neighboring village of Čestijanec.

Jalšovec had a population of 144 in 2011 census. Jalšovec is experiencing population decline since the 1980s.

References

Populated places in Međimurje County